Dideiphyta was a town of ancient Lydia, inhabited during Roman and Byzantine times.

Its site is located near Kireli in Asiatic Turkey.

References

Populated places in ancient Lydia
Former populated places in Turkey
Roman towns and cities in Turkey
Populated places of the Byzantine Empire
History of İzmir Province